Kimikawa Maru was a seaplane tender of the Imperial Japanese Navy (IJN). The ship was built by the Kawasaki Dockyard Co. at Kobe as a cargo ship for Kawasaki Kisen K. K. line. In July 1941 the ship was taken over by the IJN and converted into an auxiliary seaplane tender. She was able to operate six Aichi E13A "Jake" floatplanes. She operated in northern waters including the capture of Kiska and Attu Island. She was re-rated a converted transport (Miscellaneous) on 1 October 1943. After conversion the ship operated in the Philippines and the Dutch East Indies.

External links
 IJN Seaplane Tender KIMIKAWA MARU: Tabular Record of Movement

 

Ships sunk by American submarines
Kamikawa Maru-class seaplane tenders
Maritime incidents in October 1944
Ships of the Kawasaki Kisen
Ships of the Aleutian Islands campaign
Ships built by Kawasaki Heavy Industries